Domingos Olímpio Braga Cavalcanti (September 18, 1851 – October 7, 1906) was a Brazilian novelist, journalist and playwright, famous for his Naturalist novel Luzia-Homem.

Life
Olímpio was born in the city of Sobral, in the State of Ceará, in 1857. Graduated in Law at the Faculdade de Direito do Recife, he exercised journalistic career in Recife, Belém and Rio de Janeiro, working for newspapers such as O Comércio, Jornal do Commercio, Correio do Povo, José do Patrocínio's A Cidade do Rio, Gazeta de Notícias and O País. Writing under the pen name Pojucã, he was the director of the periodic Os Anais, where he published many books under feuilleton form, such as O Almirante and the unfinished O Uirapuru.

He also lived with his family in the United States, working at the Brazilian embassy in Washington during the Grover Cleveland government, when the Brazilian borders with Argentina were fixed. Two of his seven children were born during this mission.

Olímpio would try to join the Brazilian Academy of Letters, but Mário de Alencar was accepted in his place instead. Only Olavo Bilac would support Olímpio in his attempt.

Works

Novels
 Luzia-Homem (1903)
 O Almirante
 O Uirapuru (unfinished)

Theatre plays
 A Perdição (1874)
 Rochedos que Choram
 Túnica Nessus
 Tântalo
 Um Par de Galhetas
 Os Maçons e o Bispo
 Domitila

Miscellaneous
 História da Missão Especial de Washington
 A Questão do Acre
 A Loucura na Política

References
 COUTINHO, Afrânio; SOUSA, J. Galante de. Enciclopédia da Literatura Brasileira. São Paulo: Global.

External links

 

1851 births
1906 deaths
Brazilian diplomats
Brazilian journalists
Brazilian male novelists
Brazilian male dramatists and playwrights
People from Sobral, Ceará
Portuguese-language writers
19th-century Brazilian novelists
19th-century Brazilian dramatists and playwrights
19th-century Brazilian male writers